Athletics competitions have been held at every Pacific Games since the inaugural edition 1963 in Suva, Fiji and at every Pacific Mini Games since the inaugural edition 1981 in Honiara, Solomon Islands.  Both events are open for the 22 member federations of the Pacific Games Council.   The Pacific Games started as South Pacific Games and were renamed in 2011, whereas the Pacific Mini Games started as South Pacific Mini Games and were renamed in 2009.

Pacific Games

Editions

All-time Pacific Games medal table
Medal winners for the athletics events of the Pacific Games until 2003 were published.  Complete results can be found on the Oceania Athletics Association webpage. After the 2015 games, only Kiribati, Niue, Northern Mariana Islands, Tokelau, and Tuvalu are yet to win a medal.

The following table has the all-time medal tally for athletics at the Pacific Games from 1963 to 2015:

Pacific Mini Games

Editions

Medals
Medal winners for the athletics events of the Pacific Mini Games until 2005 were published.  Complete results can be found on the Oceania Athletics Association webpage.

See also
List of Pacific Games records in athletics

Notes
 Four parasport events were included (three for men and one for women).

 Six parasport events were included (three for men and three for women).

 Ten parasport events were included (five for men and five for women).

External links
Athletics medallists from 1963 to 2003 South Pacific Games
Athletics medallists from 1981 to 2005 South Pacific Mini Games

References

Pacific Games
 

Pacific Mini Games
Pacific Games